Atimia is a genus of long-horned beetles in the family Cerambycidae. There are about 13 described species in Atimia.

Species
These 13 species belong to the genus Atimia:

 Atimia chinensis Linsley, 1939 c g
 Atimia confusa (Say, 1826) i c g b (small cedar borer)
 Atimia esakii Hayashi, 1974 c g
 Atimia gannoni Hovore and Giesbert, 1974 i c g
 Atimia helenae Linsley, 1934 i c g
 Atimia hoppingi Linsley, 1939 i c g
 Atimia huachucae Champlain & Knull, 1922 i c g b
 Atimia juniperi Holzschuh, 1984 c g
 Atimia maculipuncta (Semenov & Plavilstshikov, 1937) c g
 Atimia mexicana Linsley, 1934 c g
 Atimia okayamensis Hayashi, 1972 c g
 Atimia truncatella Holzschuh, 2007 c g
 Atimia vandykei Linsley, 1939 i c g

Data sources: i = ITIS, c = Catalogue of Life, g = GBIF, b = Bugguide.net

References

Further reading

External links

 

Spondylidinae
Articles created by Qbugbot